Kowloon Bay Park is a public park in Kowloon Bay, Kowloon, Hong Kong. The park is managed by Leisure and Cultural Services Department. It was opened on 30 March 2005.

Facilities

Natural turf pitch
The natural turf pitch is designed for soccer and rugby games. It was opened on 3 May 2005.

Since 2009–10 season, it has been a Hong Kong First Division venue.

Cycling ground
There is a cycling area within the park. A kiosk offers bicycles for hire.

See also

List of urban public parks and gardens in Hong Kong

References

Urban public parks and gardens in Hong Kong
Kowloon Bay
2005 establishments in Hong Kong
Sports venues in Hong Kong
Football venues in Hong Kong